Fun and Games may refer to:

Music
 Fun and Games (The Huntingtons album), 1997
 Fun & Games (The Connells album), 1989
 Fun and Games (Chuck Mangione album), 1979
 The Fun and Games, a 1960s sunshine pop band from Texas
 Fun and Games, The Wiggles album, 2020
 "Fun and Games", a song by the Barenaked Ladies from Barenaked Ladies Are Me
 "Fun and Games", a song by Junior Byles, 1972; covered by Caesars Palace on Cherry Kicks, 2000.

Film and TV
 "Fun and Games" (Better Call Saul), a 2022 episode of Better Call Saul
 "Fun and Games" (The Outer Limits), a 1964 episode of The Outer Limits
 Fun and Games (film), a 1980 TV movie directed by Paul Bogart (credited as Alan Smithee)
 "Fun and Games"(Superman: The Animated Series), a 1996 episode of Superman: The Animated Series
 "Fun and Games", an episode of Playhouse Disney TV series Handy Manny

Other
 "Fun and Games", the first act of the play Who's Afraid of Virginia Woolf? by Edward Albee
 Fun and Games, a comic book series by Owen McCarron
 Fun 'n Games, a Super NES and Sega Mega Drive/Genesis video game

See also
 Funny Games (disambiguation)